The Great Islamic Coalition or the Coalition of Islamic Parties was an electoral alliance of organizations led by Islamic Republican Party, competing in 1979 Iranian Constitutional Convention election. It was the largest coalition in the elections, and used its influence on media, Islamic Revolution Committees and the mosques to oust their opponents, most importantly the Quintuple Coalition of radical Islamic groups.

Parties in coalition 
The main groups in the coalition were:
 Islamic Republican Party
 Mojahedin of the Islamic Revolution Organization
 Islamic Revolutionary Guard Corps
 Combatant Clergy Association
 Society of Seminary Teachers of Qom
 Fada'iyan-e Islam
The coalition also included smaller groups.

See also

 Quintuple Coalition
 Septuple Coalition
 Grand National Alliance

References 

1979 establishments in Iran
Aftermath of the Iranian Revolution
Defunct political party alliances in Iran